The name Danny has been used for seven tropical cyclones in the Atlantic Ocean. The name replaced "David" which was retired after the 1979 season.

 Hurricane Danny (1985), caused widespread flooding in Louisiana, killing 3 and causing $12 million in damage.
 Tropical Storm Danny (1991), formed near Cape Verde islands but dissipated before threatening land.
 Hurricane Danny (1997), struck Louisiana and Alabama; tracked across the southeastern United States and ultimately affected parts of New England with rain and wind; killed nine and caused $100 million in damage (1997 USD).
 Hurricane Danny (2003), looped in open ocean, never threatened land.
 Tropical Storm Danny (2009), formed as a tropical storm east of the Bahamas, skipping depression status; later absorbed by a frontal system off the US east coast.
 Hurricane Danny (2015), a small category 3 hurricane that approached the Leeward Islands but dissipated before threatening land.
 Tropical Storm Danny (2021), formed shortly before making landfall in South Carolina.

Atlantic hurricane set index articles